Stathmopoda stimulata is a moth of the family Stathmopodidae first described by Edward Meyrick in 1913. It is found in India and Sri Lanka. Japan and Korea

References

Moths of Asia
Moths described in 1913
Stathmopodidae